Railway Murders is a documentary series narrated by Nicholas Day. It debuted in May 2021 on Yesterday. In September 2021 it was broadcast on ZDFinfo. Regular contributors include Donald Rumbelow, Judith Rowbotham and Alan Moss.

Episode list

Series 1

See also
History of rail transport in Great Britain

References

External links
3dd Productions

2020s British documentary television series
2021 British television series debuts
English-language television shows
Documentary television series about crime
Documentary television series about railway transport
Railway accidents and incidents in Great Britain
UKTV original programming